Pasquale Di Pietro (born 25 March 1894, date of death unknown) was an Italian racing cyclist. He rode in the 1924 Tour de France.

References

External links
 

1894 births
Year of death missing
Italian male cyclists
Place of birth missing
People from Terni
Sportspeople from the Province of Terni
Cyclists from Umbria